The 2015 European Championship C tournament was the eighth staging of the Rugby League European Bowl tournament played in the respective European countries participating between 26 September to 17 October 2015.

Qualification
A preliminary match was played between Latvia and Spain on 9 May 2015 for the third place in the competition.

Standings

Fixtures
The winner of the competition will join the top three 2014–15 European Championship B nations along with Ireland and Wales in a two group round robin competition to qualify for the 2017 Rugby League World Cup.

Notes
  Malta were awarded a 30-0 victory by the RLEF after Greece defaulted. The Hellenic Federation of Rugby League has struggled to keep financially stable due to Greece's recent economic troubles. The Greek side was unable to make the trip to Malta following the withdrawal of two sponsors.

See also

2017 Rugby League World Cup qualification

References

European rugby league competitions
2015 in rugby league